Som Lepcha (born 15 February 1977) is an Indian cricketer. He made his List A debut for Sikkim in the 2018–19 Vijay Hazare Trophy on 20 September 2018.

References

External links
 

1977 births
Living people
Indian cricketers
Sikkim cricketers
Place of birth missing (living people)
Wicket-keepers